Neumarkt an der Ybbs is a town in the district of Melk in the Austrian state of Lower Austria.

Geography
The municipality consists of the following subdivisions:
Neumarkt (about 1150 inhabitants)
Kemmelbach (about 400 inhabitants)
Waasen (120 inhabitants)
Wolfsberg (75 inhabitants)
Winden (35 inhabitants)
Mauer (15 inhabitants)

References

Cities and towns in Melk District